"Saturday at Midnight" is a song from the American rock band Cheap Trick, which was released in 1983 as the fourth and final single from their sixth studio album One on One (1982). It was written by lead guitarist Rick Nielsen and vocalist Robin Zander, and produced by Roy Thomas Baker. Aimed at the club scene, the single reached No. 45 on the Billboard Dance Music/Club Play Singles Chart, and remains the band's only appearance on the chart.

The single was released on 12" vinyl only and was remixed by John Luongo. The A-side was titled "Saturday at Midnight (Super New Dance Re-Mix)" while the B-side was titled "Saturday at Midnight (Super Dub Mix)". The band had performed the song earlier on the Laugh Trax in 1982, along with "She's Tight".

Critical reception
In a review of One on One, AllMusic stated: "There are several truly odd detours on the album, usually when the group veers too strongly toward the new wave, like on the awkward, clanking "Saturday at Midnight" and the stiff Devo misinterpretation "I Want Be Man." These tracks accentuate the album's 1982 artifact appeal, but ironically, are the things that kept it from being a blockbuster at the time."

Track listing
12" single
"Saturday at Midnight (Super New Dance Re-Mix)" - 6:20
"Saturday at Midnight (Super Dub Mix)" - 7:40

Personnel 
Cheap Trick
 Robin Zander - lead vocals, rhythm guitar
 Rick Nielsen - lead guitar, backing vocals
 Jon Brant - bass, backing vocals
 Bun E. Carlos - drums, percussion

Additional personnel
 Roy Thomas Baker - producer
 John Luongo - remixer
 Ian Taylor – engineer
 Paul Klingberg – assistant
 George Marino – mastering

Charts

References

1983 singles
Cheap Trick songs
Songs written by Rick Nielsen
Songs written by Robin Zander
Song recordings produced by Roy Thomas Baker
Epic Records singles
1982 songs